Kyle James Funkhouser (born March 16, 1994) is an American professional baseball pitcher in the Texas Rangers organization. He played college baseball for the Louisville Cardinals, and was drafted by the Detroit Tigers with the 115th overall selection in the 2016 Major League Baseball draft.

Amateur career
Funkhouser attended Oak Forest High School in Oak Forest, Illinois. As a senior, he was the Illinois Gatorade Baseball Player of the Year after going 11–2 with a 0.65 earned run average (ERA) and 132 strikeouts. He finished his career with school records in wins, strikeouts, ERA and innings pitched. Funkhouser was also on the school's football and basketball teams.

As a freshman at the University of Louisville in 2013, Funkhouser appeared in 22 games for the Louisville Cardinals baseball team, with six starts. He finished the year 5–1 with a 2.14 ERA and 55 strikeouts in  innings. For his play he was named a freshman All-American by Louisville Slugger. After the 2013 season, he played collegiate summer baseball with the Chatham Anglers of the Cape Cod Baseball League. As a sophomore in 2014, Funkhouser started 18 games, finishing with a school record and NCAA Division I tying 13 wins. He also had a 1.94 ERA and 122 strikeouts. After the season, he was named a first team All-American by the American Baseball Coaches Association (ABCA). During the summer he played for the United States collegiate national team.

Funkhouser was selected by the Los Angeles Dodgers with the 35th overall pick in the 2015 Major League Baseball Draft. He opted not to sign with the Dodgers, returning to Louisville for his senior year. He reportedly turned down a signing bonus of $1.75 million.

After posting a 9–3 record with a 3.86 ERA and 95 strikeouts in  innings as a senior, Funkhouser was selected by the Detroit Tigers in the 2016 Major League Baseball Draft. He was selected in the fourth round, the 115th overall selection.

Professional career

Detroit Tigers
Funkhouser signed with the Tigers, receiving a reported $750,000 signing bonus. He made his professional debut on June 27, 2016, playing for the Connecticut Tigers of the Class A-Short Season New York-Penn League; he spent the whole season with the Tigers, playing in 13 games and pitching to an 0–2 record and 2.65 ERA.

Funkhouser began the 2017 season with the West Michigan Whitecaps of the Class A Midwest League, winning his first game on April 7. The Tigers promoted him to the Lakeland Flying Tigers of the Class A-Advanced Florida State League in May. In 12 games started between both teams, he posted a 5–2 record and 2.44 ERA with 83 strikeouts in 62.2 total innings. Funkhouser began the 2018 season with the Erie SeaWolves of the Class AA Eastern League, and earned a midseason promotion to the Toledo Mud Hens of the Class AAA International League. Funkhouser was added to the Tigers 40–man roster following the 2019 season.

On July 27, 2020, Funkhouser made his MLB debut. He earned his first major league win on September 6, 2020, against the Minnesota Twins. With the 2020 Detroit Tigers, Funkhouser appeared in 13 games, compiling a 1–1 record with 7.27 ERA and 12 strikeouts in 17.1 innings pitched.

In 2021, Funkhouser appeared most of the season in middle relief for the Tigers. He earned his first career save on September 19 against the Tampa Bay Rays. Overall in 2021, Funkhouser made 57 appearances (55 in relief), posting a 7–4 record and 3.42 ERA, while striking out 63 batters in  innings.

On April 6, 2022, the Tigers announced Funkhouser would start the 2022 season on the 10-day injured list with a right shoulder strain. On April 23, Funkhouser was moved to the 60-day injured list.

On November 18, Funkhouser was non tendered and became a free agent.

Texas Rangers
On January 5, 2023, Funkhouser signed a minor league contract with the Texas Rangers organization.

References

External links

Louisville Cardinals bio

1994 births
Living people
Baseball players from Illinois
Chatham Anglers players
Connecticut Tigers players
Detroit Tigers players
Erie SeaWolves players
Lakeland Flying Tigers players
Louisville Cardinals baseball players
Major League Baseball pitchers
People from Oak Forest, Illinois
People from Palos Heights, Illinois
Toledo Mud Hens players
West Michigan Whitecaps players